Mingde High School is a public coeducational high school in Tianxin District of Changsha, Hunan, China.

Etymology
The name was formulated based on a sentence from Great Learning, one of the "Four Books" in Confucianism.

History
Mingde High School traces its history back to the former "Mingde School", founded by educater Hu Yuantan in 1903, during late Qing dynasty.

In 1932, Chiang Kai-shek inspected the school and took pictures with teachers and students, inscribing four Chinese characters "".

In February 1938, due to the Second Sino-Japanese War, the school moved to Zeng's Ancestral Temple in Mount Xia at the junction of Hengshan, Xiangxiang and Xiangtan.

In 1941, the school was renamed "Hunan Provincial Mingde Middle School".

In November 1944, when the Japanese invaded Hunan, Hu Shaokui, then dean of education at Mingde Middle School, led the teachers and students to move to Lantian County.

On March 16, 1946, the school moved back to Taianli Campus in Changsha and was officially reopened.

After the establishment of the Communist State in 1949, the school was renamed Changsha No. 3 Middle School, New Changsha No. 3 Middle School and Power Machine No. 57 Middle School.

In 1983, the school was renamed "Changsha Mingde High School".

In August 2015, Principal Fan Qiuming was placed under investigation for corruption, bribery and unfair relationships with several women by the Central Commission for Discipline Inspection (CCDI), the Communist Party's internal disciplinary body.

Athletics
 Basketball (men's and women's)

List of principals

Notable alumni
 Politicians: Ren Bishi, Huang Xing, Chen Tianhua, Chen Guofu, Shen Liren
 Academicians of the Chinese Academy of Sciences (CAS): Ai Guoxiang, Xiao Jimei, Li Xun, Liao Shantao, Xiang Da, Wu Yaozu, Ding Xiaqi, Tang Zhisong, Zhang Xiaoqian, Jin Yuelin, Chen Hansheng
 Academicians of the Chinese Academy of Engineering (CAE): Yu Daguang, Liu Jingnan
 Academicians of the Academia Sinica: Jeffrey P. Chang, Liu Yizheng, Tsiang Tingfu

References

External links
 

Educational institutions established in 1903
High schools in Changsha
1903 establishments in China